Einar Sörensen (26 July 1875 – 23 August 1941) was a Swedish fencer. He competed in the individual and team épée events at the 1912 Summer Olympics.

References

External links
 

1875 births
1941 deaths
Swedish male épée fencers
Olympic fencers of Sweden
Fencers at the 1912 Summer Olympics
Sportspeople from Stockholm